
Amsterdam Science Park is a science park in the Oost city district of Amsterdam, Netherlands with foci on physics, mathematics, information technology and the life sciences. The 70 hectare (175 acre) park provides accommodations for science, business and housing. Resident groups include institutes of the natural science faculties of the University of Amsterdam, several research institutes, and related companies. Three of the colocations of the Amsterdam Internet Exchange are at the institutes SURFsara, NIKHEF, and Equinix-AM3 at the science park. 

In 2009, the Amsterdam Science Park railway station was by opened then-mayor Job Cohen.

Science and business

FOM Institute AMOLF (Physics of Biomolecular systems and Nanophotonics)
Advanced Research Center for Nanolithography (ARCNL)
National Research Institute for Mathematics and Computer Science (CWI)
Faculty of Science (FNWI) of the University of Amsterdam offering education programmes in biology, chemistry, computer science, earth science, physics, mathematics etc. and comprising eight research institutes, including:
Institute for Biodiversity and Ecosystem Dynamics (IBED)
Institute for Logic, Language and Computation (ILLC)
Institute of Physics (IoP)
Korteweg-de Vries Institute for Mathematics (KdVI)
Netherlands eScience Center (NLeSC)
National Institute for Subatomic Physics (Nikhef)
SURFsara (computer centre)
EGI.eu, the coordinating organisation for the European Grid Infrastructure
 More than 90 companies in the fields of ICT, life sciences, and related fields (e.g. BioDetection Systems)

Housing
At the science park, 314 residences and 721 student units have been completed. An additional 423 residences and 617 student units are planned.

Leisure
Café-restaurant 'Polder' (temporary location adjacent to the historical Anna Hoeve farm)
University Sports Centre 'Universum' (official opening October 8, 2010)
Sports Café 'Oerknal'
Meet & Eat Restaurant
Café Maslow
Ann's Farm

References

External links
Amsterdam Science Park 

Neighbourhoods of Amsterdam
Economy of Amsterdam
Amsterdam, Science Park
University of Amsterdam
Amsterdam-Oost